Memecylon subramanii is a species of plant in the family Melastomataceae. It is endemic to India.

References

Endemic flora of India (region)
subramanii
Endangered plants
Taxonomy articles created by Polbot